John Wheeler (born June 20, 1930, in Texas) is an American actor. He graduated from the University of the Pacific in 1952 with a Bachelor of Music degree.

Filmography

Film

Television

References

External links 
 

1930 births
Living people
University of the Pacific (United States) alumni
American male film actors
American male television actors
20th-century American male actors